Jamie Sanders (born in Brownsville, Kentucky) is a former American Thoroughbred horse racing jockey and current trainer. She is the trainer of Teuflesberg who won the 2007 Southwest Stakes and finished 17th in the 2007 Kentucky Derby. In fulfilling her childhood dream of training a Derby horse, Sanders is only the 13th woman to do so in its more than 130-year history.

References

Further reading

 

Living people
People from Brownsville, Kentucky
American female horse trainers
Kentucky women horse trainers
Year of birth missing (living people)
21st-century American women